237 (two hundred [and] thirty-seven) is the natural number following 236 and preceding 238.

237 is a lucky number, and one of the numbers in Aronson's sequence.

The 237th square pyramidal number, 4465475, is also a sum of two smaller square pyramidal numbers. There are only four smaller numbers (55, 70, 147, and 226) with the same property.

References

Integers